Frédéric Studer (1926–2005) was a Swiss painter. 

He has published collections of drawings, illustrated books and, in 1971, produced a short animated film. 

He has participated in numerous national and international caricature exhibitions and also exhibited his drawings in Switzerland.

References

This article was initially translated from the German Wikipedia.

1926 births
2005 deaths
20th-century Swiss painters
Swiss male painters
20th-century Swiss male artists